Martha Elizabeth Blackman (born January 1, 1927, in Dallas, Texas, died November 17, 2021, in Palo Alto, California) was an American viola da gamba player and lutenist, and the first American to perform on and teach the viol.

Biography 
Blackman studied cello at the Juilliard School under Leonard Rose. Receiving a Fulbright Scholarship (1953–54), she studied the viola da gamba, first in Munich and then at the Hochschule für Musik Freiburg.  She returned to the USA in 1954 and appeared as a leading gamba soloist, and also joining the New York Pro Musica working under Noah Greenberg from 1954-1961, during which she did most of her recording. Together with Paul Maynard and Bernard Krainis, she formed the New York Pro Musica Baroque Trio, and was also a member of the Stanley Buetens Lute Ensemble.

Since 1970 Blackman was a long time lecturer at Stanford University. She has also received an International Research & Exchanges Board (IREX) Fellowship for research of Eastern European folk and Renaissance music at the Charles University in Prague. Blackman is also an expert in French ornamentation in Baroque string music, the lyra viol, the composer Tobias Hume, and the clàrsach and its repertoire.

Publications 
Academic papers include: "A New Star", Albertus Magnus Alumnae, 3 (2) :4-7, 1966, an English translation of Hans Judenkönig's "Ain Schone Kunstliche Underweisung (1523)," Lute Society Journal, Vol XIV, 1972, various editions of early music, and for the International Horn Society Journal (unpublished), "Hunting Horns in Viola da Gamba Music".

Recordings 
The majority of her recordings are with the New York Pro Musica at Decca.  Other recordings include Experiences Anonymous, Columbia, and on other labels.

References

 Martha Blackman Discography: http://www.discogs.com/artist/Martha+Blackman
 New York Pro Musica Discography: http://www.medieval.org/emfaq/performers/nypm.html
 Stanley Buetens Lute Ensemble http://www.medieval.org/emfaq/cds/non71120.htm

Viol players
Stanford University Department of Music faculty
American performers of early music
Women performers of early music
American lutenists
American cellists
1927 births
Living people
Hochschule für Musik Freiburg alumni
Women cellists
Women music educators
Fulbright alumni